Bardibas is a municipal area (municipality) and a town located in Mahottari District of Madhesh Province of Nepal. It is located at latitude: 26°54'6.84" to 27°08'46.90" and longitude: 85°47'42.67" to 85°56'42.97". The municipality is surrounded by Dhanusha District in the East and Sarlahi District in the West, Bagmati Province falls in the North and Bhangaha, Aurahi and Gaushala municipalities are located in the South.

In 2021 census the population of Bardibas increased to 68353. The municipality is divided into total 14 wards.

The municipality was established on 2 December 2014 merging the then four VDCs of Bardibas, Maisthan, Gauribas and Kisan Nagar.

In 2015, when Government of Nepal decided to dissolve the old thousands of VDCs and declare new 753 local level body then four more VDCs were merged with this municipality, those municipalities were: Hathilet, Pashupatinagar, Khaya Mara and Bijayalpura.

The municipality was established in 2014 merging the old VDCs, so area and population of the municipality were calculated according to the 2011 Nepal census, as follows:

Etymology
The municipality named "Bardibas" after Bardibas VDC. According to the Bardibas municipality website: Longtime ago people of surrounding villages used to take rest near Bardibas area with their cattle cart, when they used to bring wooden logs from "Chure Kshetra" (Mahabharat hill area). "Bardi" means "Cattle" and "Bas" mean "Rest" in Maithili language.

Transportation
Bardibas is a major town of Madhesh Province, which is located at Mahendra Highway. The town is a three-way junction. The BP Highway connects Bardibas with the capital city Kathmandu through Sindhuli, Khurkot, Nepalthok and Dhulikhel.  A railway line connecting to Janakpur is also under construction.
Can be a sub metropolitan city in near future.

Hospitality

Hotels in Bardibas
 Gautam Hotel 
 Bardibas Resort Pvt. Ltd 
Hotel Navya Pvt Ltd (under construction ) at
Maisthan , Bardibas
Vinayak Hotel and Party palace

See also
Itahari
Dhalkebar

External links
UN map of the municipalities of Mahottari District
Rajpatra
Details of local level body

References

Populated places in Mahottari District
Nepal municipalities established in 2014
Municipalities in Madhesh Province